This is a list of gliders/sailplanes of the world, (this reference lists all gliders with references, where available) 
Note: Any aircraft can glide for a short time, but gliders are designed to glide for longer.

Austrian miscellaneous constructors 
 Etrich-Wels 1904 kite/glider
 Etrich-Wels 1906 Glider – Etrich's Leaf, 1906
 Harbich Ha-12/49 – licence built SG-38
 Lohner-Umlauff Rodelgleiter – Lohner & Umlauff, Hans von – Lohner Flugzeugbau, Vienna
 Standard Austria Österreichischer Aeroclub – Austrian Aero Club
 Malliga 1 – Malliga, Horst Josef – Human-powered aircraft
 Malliga 2 – Malliga, Horst Josef – Human-powered aircraft
 Sterz P-77
 Swaty Kandidat – Swaty, Franz
 Souczek Bussard II - Prof. Souczek with Franz Rainer

Notes

Further reading

External links

Lists of glider aircraft